Souques or Souquès is a French surname. Notable people with the surname include:

 Alexandre-Achille Souques (1860–1944), French neurologist 
 Pierre Souquès (1910–2007), French politician

French-language surnames